Chaetopappa is a genus of plants in the family Asteraceae which are known generally as leastdaisies.

These wildflowers are native to western and central North America. The flower heads bear daisies with curled ray florets which may be white to shades of blue and purple, surrounding yellow disc florets.

 Species
 Chaetopappa asteroides - Arkansas leastdaisy - Texas Oklahoma Kansas Missouri Arkansas Louisiana South Carolina Tamaulipas San Luis Potosí Veracruz Hidalgo
 Chaetopappa bellidifolia - whiteray leastdaisy - Texas 
 Chaetopappa bellioides - manyflower leastdaisy - Texas New Mexico Aguascalientes, Chihuahua, Coahuila, Durango, Nuevo León, San Luis Potosí, Tamaulipas, Zacatecas
 Chaetopappa effusa - spreading leastdaisy - Texas 
 Chaetopappa ericoides - rose heath - California Nevada Arizona Utah New Mexico Colorado Wyoming Texas Oklahoma Kansas Nebraska Chihuahua Coahuila Sonora Durango Nuevo León
 Chaetopappa hersheyi - Guadalupe leastdaisy - Texas New Mexico 
 Chaetopappa imberbis - awnless leastdaisy - Texas 
 Chaetopappa parryi - Parry's leastdaisy - Texas Coahuila, Nuevo León, San Luis Potosí, Tamaulipas 
 Chaetopappa plomoensis - Coahuila
 Chaetopappa pulchella - Coahuila

References

External links
 Jepson Manual Treatment
 USDA Plants Profile

 
Asteraceae genera